The 1997 Linfield vs. Willamette football game was a college football game between the  and the  played on October 18, 1997.  The game was played at McCulloch Stadium in Salem, Oregon.  Willamette won the game by a score of 27 to 0.  During the game, Liz Heaston became the first woman to play and score in a college football game.

Game play
Willamette's Rich Rideout ran a 5 yard touchdown in the first quarter, but it was in the second quarter after Ardell Bailey scored on a 2 yard carry that Heaston took the field and kicked her first of two extra points with 57 seconds left in the first half.

The only points in the third quarter were from Gordo Thompson's field goal, but in the fourth quarter quarterback Chuck Pinkerton completed a nine-yard pass to Kyle Carlson for a touchdown.  Heaston kicked her second extra point in the fourth quarter, and the final score was 27–0.

Aftermath
Willamette finished the regular season undefeated and advanced to the 1997 NAIA National Championship, losing to Findlay.  The next year, Willamette left the NAIA to join the NCAA Division III, along with the rest of the members schools of the Northwest Conference at that time.

Prior to this game, female athletes at Duke and Louisville had come close to playing in a game but did not.  In 2001, Ashley Martin became the second female athlete to score in a college football game, this time in the NCAA.  In 2003, Katie Hnida became the first female athlete to score in a Division I-A bowl game.

See also
 1997 NAIA football season
 List of historically significant college football games
 Women's American football

References

1997 NAIA football season
vs. Willamette 1997
vs. Linfield 1997
October 1997 sports events in the United States
1997 in sports in Oregon